Singh W Angou (born 5 July 1936) an Indian politician from Manipur and member of the Indian National Congress.

He was Member of the Rajya Sabha for the term, 10 April 1996 to 9 April 2002 from Manipur and was Chairman, Government Assurance Committee.

He has been elected to the Manipur Legislative Assembly during 1980-1995 where he served as Deputy Speaker from 1981–84 and Speaker from 1985-88.

His father is Shri W. Ibochouba Singh. He is married to Shrimati Loidang Leima Devi and has two daughters. He is resides at Lairenjam Awang Leekai, B.P.O. Laiphrakom, West Imphal district,  (Manipur).

References

Rajya Sabha members from Manipur
1936 births
Living people
Manipur MLAs 1980–1984
People from Imphal West district
Speakers of the Manipur Legislative Assembly
Deputy Speakers of the Manipur Legislative Assembly
Manipur politicians
Manipur MLAs 1985–1990